Molla Mohammad or Mulla Muhammad may refer to:

 Molla Mohammad, Bushehr
 Molla Mohammad, Razavi Khorasan